12 Again is a show that premiered on CBBC on 13 February 2012. It is presented by Iain Stirling, and each episode is 30 minutes long. The show sees various celebrities talking about what their life was like at the age of 12, usually covering news stories, what they would gossip about, favourite television programmes, favourite music, their favourite celebrities and what they would have done differently if they were 12 again.

Episodes

Series 1: 2012

"End of Summer" special
On Monday 3 September 2012 at 5:45pm, a brand new 12 Again special premiered, where many special celebrity guests revisit their favourite summer memories of when they were 12.

Series 2: 2012
A second series of 12 Again began on Friday, 21 September 2012, at 5pm, to run for 13 episodes.

Series 3: 2013

Topics covered
Introduction
What life was like for them in general when they were 12
The music they liked when they were 12
Their big moments/big news stories when they were 12
What they watched on TV when they were 12
What they would change if they were 12 again

References

External links

CBBC shows